The Bridgepoint Historic District is a historic district located north of Rocky Hill along Bridgepoint and Dead Tree Run roads in Montgomery Township, Somerset County, New Jersey. The district was added to the National Register of Historic Places on June 10, 1975 for its significance in agriculture and commerce from 1730 to 1850. It includes nine contributing buildings and two contributing structures.

See also
National Register of Historic Places listings in Somerset County, New Jersey

References

External links
 

Montgomery Township, New Jersey
Historic districts on the National Register of Historic Places in New Jersey
National Register of Historic Places in Somerset County, New Jersey
New Jersey Register of Historic Places
Georgian architecture in New Jersey
Victorian architecture in New Jersey